Clanculus plebejus, common name the plebeian clanculus, is a species of sea snail, a marine gastropod mollusk in the family Trochidae, the top snails.

Description
The size of the shell varies between 6 mm and 11 mm. The small shell is depressed and umbilicate. It is pinkish brown, gray or yellow, the ribs articulated with dots of black and white, often forming radiating lines above, zigzag beneath, where yellow replaces pink in the ground-color. The spire is low-conic. The apex is acute. The about 5 whorls are coarsely lirate. The sutures are subcanaliculate. The body whorl is obtusely angular at the periphery. Its upper surface is encircled by 4 coarse, somewhat beaded lirae, the upper two contiguous, the third separated by wide intervals above and below it, the fourth peripheral, usually formed of two ridges close together. The interstices bear numerous fine spiral striae and sharp microscopic incremental striae. The convex base is concentrically sculptured with numerous (6 to 9) smooth striae, in the intervals between which very numerous microscopic striulae revolve. The rounded aperture is oblique. The outer and basal margins are thickened and very minutely crenulated within. The columella is oblique and not tortuous above, nor entering the umbilicus, but inserted upon its side. The front edge is nearly straight, denticulate at the base. The wide umbilicus is not very deep, its margin somewhat denticulate.

Distribution
This marine species is endemic to Australia and occurs off New South Wales, South Australia, Tasmania, Victoria and Western Australia

References

 Philippi, R.A. 1852. Centuria quarta Testaceorum novorum. Zeitschrift für Malakozoologie 1851: 39-48
 Adams, A. 1853. Contributions towards a monograph of the Trochidae, a family of gastropodous Mollusca. Proceedings of the Zoological Society of London 1851(19): 150-192 
 Philippi, R.A. 1855. Trochidae. pp. 313–372 in Küster, H.C. (ed). Systematisches Conchylien-Cabinet von Martini und Chemnitz. Nürnberg : Bauer & Raspe Vol. 2.
 Angas, G.F. 1865. On the marine molluscan fauna of the Province of South Australia, with a list of all the species known up to the present time, together with remarks on their habitats and distribution, etc. Proceedings of the Zoological Society of London 1865: 155-"180"
 Angas, G.F. 1871. A list of additional species of marine Mollusca to be included in the fauna of Port-Jackson and the adjacent coasts of New South Wales. Proceedings of the Zoological Society of London 1871(1): 87-101, pl. 1.
 Tenison-Woods, J.E. 1877. On some new Tasmanian marine shells. Papers and Proceedings of the Royal Society of Tasmania 1876: 131-159
 Fischer, P. 1878. Genres Calcar, Trochus, Xenophora, Tectarius et Risella. pp. 241–336 in Keiner, L.C. (ed.). Spécies general et iconographie des coquilles vivantes. Paris : J.B. Baillière Vol. 11.
 Petterd, W. 1879. Critical remarks on the Rev. J.E. Tenison-Woods' "Census of Tasmanian Shells". Journal de Conchyliologie 2(12): 353-354 
 Tenison-Woods, J.E. 1879. Census; with brief descriptions of the marine shells of Tasmania and the adjacent islands. Proceedings of the Royal Society of Tasmania 1877: 26-57
 Tenison-Woods, J.E. 1880. On some Tasmanian Trochidae. Proceedings of the Royal Society of Tasmania 1879: 59-70
 Whitelegge, T. 1889. List of the Marine and Freshwater Invertebrate Fauna of Port Jackson and the Neighbourhood. Journal and Proceedings of the Royal Society of New South Wales 23: 1-161
 Tate, R. & May, W.L. 1901. A revised census of the marine Mollusca of Tasmania. Proceedings of the Linnean Society of New South Wales 26(3): 344-471
 Pritchard, G.B. & Gatliff, J.H. 1902. Catalogue of the marine shells of Victoria. Part V. Proceedings of the Royal Society of Victoria 14(2): 85-138
 May, W.L 1903. On Tenison-Woods types in the Tasmanian Museum, Hobart. Proceedings of the Royal Society of Tasmania 1902: 106-114
 Hardy, G.H. 1916. List of the Tenison Woods types of recent molluscs in the Tasmanian Museum. Proceedings of the Royal Society of Tasmania 1915: 68
 Hedley, C. 1916. A preliminary index of the Mollusca of Western Australia. Journal and Proceedings of the Royal Society of Western Australia 1: 152-226
 Hedley, C. 1918. A checklist of the marine fauna of New South Wales. Part 1. Journal and Proceedings of the Royal Society of New South Wales 51: M1-M120 
 May, W.L. 1921. A Checklist of the Mollusca of Tasmania. Hobart, Tasmania : Government Printer 114 pp
 May, W.L. 1923. An Illustrated Index of Tasmanian Shells. Hobart : Government Printer 100 pp. 
 Iredale, T. 1924. Results from Roy Bell's molluscan collections. Proceedings of the Linnean Society of New South Wales 49(3): 179-279, pl. 33-36
 Singleton, F.A. 1937. Lady Julia Percy Island. 1935 Expedition. Mollusca. Proceedings of the Royal Society of Victoria 49: 387-396 
 Allan, J.K. 1950. Australian Shells: with related animals living in the sea, in freshwater and on the land. Melbourne : Georgian House xix, 470 pp., 45 pls, 112 text figs.
 Cotton, B.C. 1959. South Australian Mollusca. Archaeogastropoda. Handbook of the Flora and Fauna of South Australia. Adelaide : South Australian Government Printer 449 pp.
 Macpherson, J.H. & Gabriel, C.J. 1962. Marine Molluscs of Victoria. Melbourne : Melbourne University Press & National Museum of Victoria 475 pp
 Macpherson, J.H. 1966. Port Philip Survey 1957-1963. Memoirs of the National Museum of Victoria, Melbourne 27: 201-288
 Ludbrook, N.H. 1978. Quaternary molluscs of the western part of the Eucla Basin. Bulletin of the Geological Survey of Western Australia 125: 1-286 
 Iredale, T. & McMichael, D.F. 1962. A reference list of the marine Mollusca of New South Wales. Memoirs of the Australian Museum 11: 1-109
 Phillips, D.A.B., Handreck, C., Bock, P.E., Burn, R., Smith, B.J. & Staples, D.A. (eds) 1984. Coastal Invertebrates of Victoria: an atlas of selected species. Melbourne : Marine Research Group of Victoria & Museum of Victoria 168 pp.
 Wilson, B. 1993. Australian Marine Shells. Prosobranch Gastropods. Kallaroo, Western Australia : Odyssey Publishing Vol. 1 408 pp
 Jansen, P. 1995. A review of the genus Clanculus Montfort, 1810 (Gastropoda: Trochidae) in Australia, with description of a new subspecies and the introduction of a nomen novum. Vita Marina 43(1-2): 39-62.

External links
 To Biodiversity Heritage Library (3 publications)
 To World Register of Marine Species
 

plebejus
Gastropods of Australia
Gastropods described in 1852
Taxa named by Rodolfo Amando Philippi